Julia Murdock Smith Dixon Middleton (May 1, 1831 – September 12, 1880) was an early member of the Latter Day Saint movement and the eldest surviving child and only daughter of Joseph Smith and Emma Hale Smith. She was adopted by the Smiths.

Her birth mother died giving birth to Julia and her twin brother Joseph, so their birth father John Murdock offered them to Smith and his wife, who themselves had lost prematurely born twins the same day. After Joseph and Emma Smith had taken custody of the children, in late March 1832, the infant Joseph became ill. Consequently Emma decided to have the babies sleep separately to prevent a spread of the disease. Joseph Smith had taken baby Joseph to bed with him and Emma was in the other room with Julia. That night a mob came and stormed the Smith home. In the midst of the panic, baby Joseph was exposed to the cold air and died several days later.

After the death of Joseph Smith, Julia and her surviving four brothers remained in Nauvoo, Illinois, with their mother Emma. In 1848, at seventeen, Julia eloped with an older man Elisha Dixon, and the couple married in Nauvoo. They moved to Texas so he could work on a steamboat. In 1851, Dixon was injured in a steamboat accident. He died, probably in 1853, as a result of these injuries. Julia returned to Nauvoo and lived with her mother until November 19, 1856, when she married John J. Middleton, a local farmer. They moved to St Louis Missouri shortly after that for employment. It was a difficult time for his employment and their marriage. Middleton was a devout Catholic, and Julia was baptized into the Catholic Church on November 9, 1857.

In 1876, Julia moved back to Nauvoo, after her husband left her and went west. She lived with her mother at the Riverside Mansion, the brick home Emma's second husband Major Lewis C. Bidamon had built. Emma's health failed early in 1879, and Julia was with her, as were Joseph III and Alexander, when she died on April 30, 1879. After Emma's death, Julia went home with Alexander to Andover, Missouri. She died of breast cancer, at age forty-nine on September 12, 1880.

Obituary

References

 Murdock, S. Reed.  "Joseph & Emma's Julia, The Other Twin."  Eborn Books: Salt Lake City, 2004.  .

External links
 "Julia M. Smith Middleton", Joseph Smith Papers
 Julia Murdock Smith Dixon Middleton Family album and history
 Julia Murdock Smith entry at the Joseph Smith Jr. Family Organization website

1831 births
1880 deaths
19th-century American people
19th-century American women
Smith family (Latter Day Saints)
Former Latter Day Saints
People from Nauvoo, Illinois
American twins
Converts to Roman Catholicism
Deaths from breast cancer
Deaths from cancer in Illinois
American adoptees
Catholics from Illinois
Children of Joseph Smith